Momenti is a 1982 album by Julio Iglesias recorded in Italian.
Music arranged by Ramón Arcusa and Rafael Ferro.
Italian lyrics by Gianni Belfiore.
In 1985 it was reported by the Canadian Recording Industry Assn. (CRIA) that Antonio Crispino was tried following a police investigation into the ordering and distribution of counterfeit copies of Momenti.

Track listing

Side A
Sono Un Vagabondo (4:01) 	
La Donna Che Voglio (4:06) 	
Bella Bella (3:27) 	
Momenti (3:33) 	
Amor, Amor, Amor (3:20)

Side B
Nathalie (3:54) 	
Se L'Amore Se Ne Va (3:48) 	
Venezia A Settembre (4:38) 	
Avanti Tutta (3:36) 	
Arrangiati Amore (3:18)

Charts

Weekly charts

Year-end charts

Certifications

References

Bibliography

 

1982 albums
Julio Iglesias albums
Italian-language albums
CBS Records albums